Durrat Al Bahrain is the third largest artificial island in Bahrain after Northern City and Diyar Al Muharraq Islands. 

Description
Durrat Al Bahrain islands include luxury villas with either sea or beach views, parks, sports facilities, mosques, shops, restaurants, 12 bridges, and a marina. The project has a cost of about US$1.3 billion.

The marina is a joint venture between the Bahraini government and Kuwait Finance House, one of the GCC region's leading banks. The marina development is the first of its type and size in the Middle East.

History
In 2002, plans were laid down for the project. Work began in 2004.
In February 2008, work on the project was interrupted as more than 1,300 laborers laid down tools in a dispute over pay. Workers who were based at a laborers' camp on the development site, went on strike demanding better salaries and complaining of poor living conditions. The strike was called off soon after.

Geography
It has six atolls, five fish-shaped islands, two crescent-shaped islands, and two more small islands related to the Marina area.

Administration
The island belongs to Southern Governorate.  The Development Company established an organization to manage the ongoing operation of the development.  Julian Butson was appointed as the first chief executive officer of Durrat Resort Management.

Transportation
The islands have two causeways connecting them to Bahrain Island.

Image gallery

See also 

 List of islands of Bahrain

References 

Populated places in the Southern Governorate, Bahrain
Islands of Bahrain
Artificial islands of Bahrain
Islands of the Persian Gulf